Hafizpur is a census town in Azamgarh district in the Indian state of Uttar Pradesh.

Demographics
 India census, Hafizpur had a population of 4,520. Males constitute 53% of the population and females 47%. Hafizpur has an average literacy rate of 45%, lower than the national average of 59.5%: male literacy is 56%, and female literacy is 34%. In Hafizpur, 16% of the population is under 6 years of age.

References

Cities and towns in Azamgarh district